The Local Government Board oversaw local government in England and Wales from 1871 to 1919 

Local Government Board may also refer to:
 Local Government Board for Ireland (1872–1922)
 Local Government Board for Scotland (1894–1919)
 Local Government Board (Isle of Man) (1922–1986)

See also
 Local Government Commission (disambiguation)